"Ebony Eyes" is a song recorded by American singers Rick James and Smokey Robinson for the Gordy (Motown) label. It was released in November 1983 as the third single from James' seventh studio album Cold Blooded. The song was produced and arranged by James. It peaked at number 43 on the Billboard Hot 100 chart.

History

Song information
"Ebony Eyes" was a collaborative effort between Smokey Robinson and Rick James. First released on the album Cold Blooded, "Ebony Eyes" climbed the R&B charts and peaked at number 22. "Ebony Eyes" remains one of James' most notable hits as it is one of the few to not use the style he labeled "punk-funk" but instead uses a more contemporary tempo and follows a more classic style of R&B. Robinson was credited for singing the introduction, bridge, and other more calm verses while James sang the chorus.

"Ebony Eyes" begins with a simple beat which leads into a more complex rhythm and the vocals of both Robinson and uncredited background vocalist who repeat falsetto vocals twice before Robinson begins the opening verse. The song chronicles the narrators affection for a certain woman. Lost for words and made weak by the mere presence of this lady, Robinson requires James' vocals to reveal how he really feels about this woman, who James thinks is unaware of his affection and apparent need for her. It is an ode to love for women of color, hence the title "Ebony Eyes".

Personnel
 Vocals, and Composition by Smokey Robinson and Rick James
 Produced, and Arranged by Rick James

Chart performance

External links
  Ebony Eyes Lyrics

References

1983 songs
1983 singles
Rick James songs
Smokey Robinson songs
Songs written by Rick James
Motown singles
Song recordings produced by Rick James